Microvoluta is a genus of very small sea snails, marine gastropod molluscs in the family Volutomitridae.

Species
Species in the genus Microvoluta include:

 Microvoluta amphissa Bouchet & Kantor, 2004
 Microvoluta australis Angas, 1877
 † Microvoluta balteata (Marwick, 1931)
 Microvoluta blakeana  (Dall, 1889)
 Microvoluta corona Simone & Cunha, 2012
 Microvoluta cryptomitra Bouchet & Kantor, 2004
 Microvoluta cythara Bouchet & Kantor, 2004
 Microvoluta dolichura Bouchet & Kantor, 2004
 Microvoluta echinata Bouchet & Kantor, 2004
 Microvoluta engonia Bouchet & Kantor, 2004
 † Microvoluta fracta (Marwick, 1926) 
 Microvoluta garrardi Cernohorsky, 1975
 Microvoluta hondana (Yokoyama, 1922)
 Microvoluta intermedia (Dall, 1889)
 Microvoluta joloensis Cernohorsky, 1970
 Microvoluta marginata (Hutton, 1885)
 † Microvoluta marwicki (Vella, 1954) 
 Microvoluta miranda (E. A. Smith, 1891)
 Microvoluta mitrella Bouchet & Kantor, 2004
 † Microvoluta nodulata P. A. Maxwell, 1988 
 † Microvoluta pentaploca Finlay, 1927 
 Microvoluta respergens Bouchet & Kantor, 2004
 Microvoluta royana Iredale, 1924
 Microvoluta stadialis (Hedley, 1911)
 Microvoluta superstes Bouchet & Warén, 1985
 Microvoluta teretiuscula (Thiele, 1925)
 Microvoluta veldhoveni deJong and Coomans, 1988
 † Microvoluta vetusta Laws, 1936 
 † Microvoluta wainuioruensis (Vella, 1954) 
Species brought into synonymy
 Microvoluta cuvierensis Finlay, 1930 synonym of Microvoluta marginata (Hutton, 1885)
 Microvoluta euzonata (G. B. Sowerby III, 1900): synonym of Austromitra euzonata (G. B. Sowerby III, 1900)
 Microvoluta obconica Powell, 1952 synonym of Peculator obconicus (Powell, 1952)
 Microvoluta ponderi Cernohorsky, 1975 synonym of Microvoluta miranda (E. A. Smith, 1891)
 Microvoluta purpureostoma Hedley & May, 1908 synonym of Microvoluta australis Angas, 1877

References

 Marwick, J. (1931). The Tertiary Mollusca of the Gisborne District. New Zealand Geological Survey Paleontological Bulletin 13:1-177. 18: pls.

Further reading 
 Powell A. W. B., New Zealand Mollusca, William Collins Publishers Ltd, Auckland, New Zealand 1979 
 SeaShells of NSW

Volutomitridae
Extant Zanclean first appearances